Ethnonymic surnames
Turco is an Italian surname. Notable people with the surname include:

 Bruno Turco (born 1991), Brazilian defensive midfielder 
 Carla Turco, Argentine-born television personality, designer, and community advocate
 Cesare Turco (c.1510- c.1560), Italian Renaissance painter
 Enzo Turco (1902–1983), Italian film actor
 Giuliomaria Turco (born 1982), Venetian independentist, politician and pharmacist
 Giulia Turco (1848–1912), Baroness from Trento, Italy 
 Jean Turco (born 1917), French politician
 Lewis Turco (born 1934), American writer
 Livia Turco (born 1955), Italian politician
 Marco Turco (born 1960), Italian director and screenwriter
 Mario Turco (born 1956), former Australian rules footballer 
 Marty Turco (born 1975), Canadian hockey player
 Michael Turco, American magician
 Paige Turco (born 1965), American actress
 Peppino Turco (1846–1907), Italian journalist and songwriter
 Richard P. Turco (born 1943), American atmospheric scientist
 Rosselli del Turco, family from Florence, Italy
 Salvatore Turco, American biochemist
 Tommaso Turco (died 1649), the Master of the Order of Preachers from 1644 to 1649

See also 

 Del Turco (surname)
 Turco (disambiguation)